Skeggs or Skegg is a surname, and may refer to:

Beverley Skeggs, English academic
Bruce Skeggs (1932–2013), Australian politician
Cliff Skeggs (born 1931), New Zealand businessman 
David Skegg (born 1947), New Zealand epidemiologist
Roy Skeggs, film producer for Hammer Films

See also
Skeg
Skegss, Australian surf band